Louis D. Burgio (May 16, 1954 – August 20, 2022) was an American gerontologist formerly the Harold R. Johnson Professor of Social Work and research professor at University of Michigan and previously a UA Distinguished Professor at University of Alabama.

Early life and education 
Burgio was born on 16 May 1954 in Buffalo to John Burgio and Angeline Burgio (née Lipomi). He grew up in a Sicilian Italian neighborhood in Buffalo. He studied at Canesius College, and then at the University of Notre Dame where he got his Ph.D. developmental psychology and applied behavior analysis.

References 

University of Michigan faculty
University of Alabama faculty
American gerontologists
Living people
Year of birth missing (living people)
Place of birth missing (living people)